Altererythrobacter xiamenensis is a Gram-negative and aerobic bacterium from the genus of Altererythrobacter which has been isolated from seawater in Xiamen in China.

References 

Sphingomonadales
Bacteria described in 2014